is a former Japanese football player.

Playing career
Muroi was born in Saitama on June 22, 1974. After graduating from high school, he joined Kashima Antlers in 1993. Although he could not become a regular player behind Yutaka Akita and Ryosuke Okuno, he played as an important substitute center back player. The club won the champions 1996, 1998 J1 League, 1997 J.League Cup and 1997 Emperor's Cup. In 2000, he moved to his local club Urawa Reds in J2 League. He played many matches and the club was promoted to J1 League. In 2001, he could hardly play in the match and he moved to Cerezo Osaka in July. However the club results were bad and was relegated to J2 League. In 2002, he returned to Urawa Reds. He played many matches and the club won the champions 2003 J.League Cup. In 2005, he moved to Vissel Kobe. However he could not play many matches and moved to Yokohama FC in 2006. He retired end of 2007 season.

Club statistics

References

External links

1974 births
Living people
Association football people from Saitama Prefecture
Japanese footballers
J1 League players
J2 League players
Kashima Antlers players
Urawa Red Diamonds players
Cerezo Osaka players
Vissel Kobe players
Yokohama FC players
Association football defenders